Gregg Karukas (born 1956) is a smooth jazz pianist from Maryland who first gained notice in Washington, D.C., then moved to Los Angeles in 1983. He backed Melissa Manchester before he co-founded the Rippingtons in 1985. 

He experimented with drums, guitar, trumpet, and keyboards as a child, but it was not until his teens that he pursued music professionally as a pianist, having played with the Bowie High School Starliners big band. When he was sixteen, he owned one of the first Minimoog synthesizers.

Karukas spent five years with Tim Eyermann in the band East Coast Offering. After moving to Los Angeles, he worked with Shelby Flint, David Benoit, Richard Elliot, Grant Geissman, Dave Koz, Ronnie Laws, and Melissa Manchester. He was a member of the Rippingtons when they recorded their first album, Moonlighting, in November 1985. He has worked as a sideman with Larry Carlton, Jeffrey Osborne, George Duke, Rick Braun, Brenda Russell, Craig Chaquico, Boney James, and Peter White.

Karukas has received multiple Best Keyboardist nominations at the Oasis and National Smooth Jazz Awards. He has collaborated with Brazilian composer Dori Caymmi and Ricardo Silveira. He produced, arranged, engineered, and co-wrote two albums with Omar Akram, whose Echoes of Love won the Grammy Award for Best New Age Album in 2013.

He owns and distributes most of his music on his label, Nightowl Records .

Studio albums

References

External links

1956 births
20th-century American pianists
American jazz pianists
American male pianists
American people of Greek descent
Living people
Musicians from Baltimore
Smooth jazz pianists
The Rippingtons members
Jazz musicians from Maryland
21st-century American pianists
20th-century American male musicians
21st-century American male musicians
American male jazz musicians